Claudiu Pamfile (born 14 January 1997) is a Romanian professional footballer who plays as a defender for Șoimii Lipova.

Honours
Hermannstadt
Cupa României: Runner-up 2017–18

References

External links
 
 
 Claudiu Pamfile at lpf.ro

1997 births
Living people
People from Tecuci
Romanian footballers
Association football defenders
Liga I players
Liga II players
Liga III players
FC Hermannstadt players
FC Brașov (1936) players
CS Minaur Baia Mare (football) players
SSU Politehnica Timișoara players